Sistar19 was the first and only official sub-group of South Korean girl group Sistar and was formed by Starship Entertainment in 2011. The sub-group is composed of Bora and Hyolyn. Their debut single "Ma Boy" was released in May 2011. Their second and most successful single "Gone Not Around Any Longer" was released in 2013, with an EP with the same title. The sub-group disbanded on June 4, 2017, alongside the official group.

History

2011–2013: "Ma Boy" and Gone Not Around Any Longer 

Sistar19 is a two-member sub-unit of Sistar under Starship Entertainment. Sistar19 was formed in 2011, with Sistar's main vocalist Hyolyn and rapper Bora. They held their debut performance as Sistar19 on May 5, 2011, on M Countdown with the single "Ma Boy", released that month. Their first mini album entitled Gone Not Around Any Longer was released on January 31, 2013. The lead single of the same name ascended to the top of the Billboard Korea K-Pop Hot 100 chart. In 2013, Sistar19 was nominated in the 2013 World Music Awards.

Members
Adapted from the group's profile on Naver's official website.

 Hyolyn – leader, main vocal

 Bora – rapper

Discography

Extended plays

Singles

Other charted songs

Videography

Music videos

Awards

Notes

References

External links 
 Official Website

Sistar
K-pop music groups
Musical groups established in 2011
South Korean dance music groups
Starship Entertainment artists
South Korean pop music groups
South Korean girl groups
2011 establishments in South Korea